Shaw Farm is located on Sand Island of the Apostle Islands National Lakeshore.

History
The farm was originally owned by Francis Shaw. It was later owned by Fred C. Andersen, President of Andersen Frame Company. The farm was listed on the National Register of Historic Places in 1976. Later, it was added to the Wisconsin State Register of Historic Places in 1989.

References

Farms on the National Register of Historic Places in Wisconsin
National Register of Historic Places in Bayfield County, Wisconsin
National Register of Historic Places in Apostle Islands National Lakeshore
Geography of Bayfield County, Wisconsin